Kim Se-jeong (born August 28, 1996), known mononymously as Sejeong, is a South Korean singer and actress. She finished second in Mnet's girl group survival show Produce 101, becoming a member of the project girl group I.O.I. She was also a member of Jellyfish Entertainment's girl group Gugudan. She is currently active as a solo artist and actress, best known for her lead roles in the television series School 2017 (2017), The Uncanny Counter (2020–2021), and Business Proposal (2022).

Early life and education 
Kim Se-jeong was born on August 28, 1996, in Gimje, North Jeolla Province, but moved to Anyang, Gyeonggi where she stayed with her mother and older brother at her aunt's house. Her parents split when she was a child, leaving her mother to single-handedly raise her and her brother. She has previously stated that she did not contact her father until she was in her third year of middle school. Before her debut, Kim participated in track and field competitions in elementary and middle school and was part of the Theatre Club in her high school. Kim passed Jellyfish Entertainment's auditions through a competition of 3,000 to 1 ratio, thus becoming a trainee. Kim is currently studying practical music at Hanyang Women's University.

Career

2012–2016: First television appearances and debut with I.O.I 

In 2012, Kim participated in the second season of competition television show K-pop Star 2 at the age of 16. She did not make it through the second round ranking audition, but Yang Hyun-suk brought her back as a wildcard for the casting round, where Kim performed a duet of Taeyang's "I Need A Girl" with fellow contestant Jo Yoo-min. Yang cast the both of them, grouping Kim with contestants Nicole Curry and Lee Soo-kyung for the final casting round. At the end of the round, she was eliminated from the competition.

In January 2016, Kim represented Jellyfish Entertainment together with fellow trainees Kim Na-young and Kang Mi-na on the reality survival show Produce 101, where they competed for the chance to debut in an Mnet project girl group. All three were assigned to "Group A" in the first episode of the program and Kim achieved the first-place ranking on several episodes, earning the nickname "God Sejeong". The program came to an end on April 1, 2016, and the final line-up of I.O.I, consisting of the top 11 poll-winners, was announced. Kim was the runner-up contestant, garnering 525,352 votes, officially becoming a member of the girl group I.O.I. They debuted on May 4, 2016, with the lead single "Dream Girls" from the album Chrysalis. I.O.I promoted for less than a year and officially disbanded in January 2017. The members returned to their respective agencies at the end of their contracts.

2016–2018: Gugudan and early acting roles 

On June 10, 2016, YMC Entertainment revealed that Kim would not be taking part in I.O.I's unit promotions but would instead return to her agency to debut and promote with its upcoming girl group. On June 28, 2016, while still a member of I.O.I, Kim with her fellow I.O.I member Kang Mi-na officially debuted as members of South Korean girl group Gugudan with the lead single "Wonderland". On November 23, 2016, Kim participated in Jellyfish Entertainment's music channel project Jelly Box and released the single "Flower Way", produced by Zico, along with a music video. The single peaked at number two on the Gaon Digital Chart. Kim received her first music program trophy as a solo artist with "Flower Way" on the November 30 episode of Show Champion, making her one of the fastest soloist to win in a music show. On January 12, 2017, Kim released the song "If Only" for the soundtrack of the drama The Legend of the Blue Sea.  Later that year, she collaborated with Lee Tae-il of Block B for the digital single "I Like You, I Don't", which charted at number 8 in Gaon Music Charts. Kim also collaborated with NCT's Doyoung titled "Star Blossom" for SM Station Season 2 music project.

Aside from singing, Kim established herself as an "ace" in variety shows with her multiple streak guesting in popular entertainment programs.
Kim hosted the new KBS show Talents for Sale alongside Kim Jong-kook, Lee Seo-jin and Noh Hong-chul
where she displayed a variety of talents on the show and earned the nickname 'Variety Cheat Key'.  She would later get a "Rookie Variety" nomination in the 15th KBS Entertainment Awards. In March 2017, she joined the reality-documentary Law of the Jungle in Sumatra headed by the chief Kim Byung-man in a remote area in Sumatra, Indonesia. Kim displayed her athletic and survival skills such as diving and fishing for several episodes earning her a "survival ace" nickname by the producers. She was awarded with a Best Challenge Award on the 11th SBS Entertainment Awards. Later on, Kim once again showed her physical skills and was dubbed as "Wonder Sejeong" when she joined the Boat Horn Clenched Fists crew on a fishing mission in Imjado, an island in county in South Jeolla Province with Kim Jong-min, Lee Sangmin, Kim Byung-man whom she worked with in Law of the Jungle and among others.

In July 2017, she took on her first major acting role as the lead, Ra Eun-ho, in KBS2's teen drama School 2017 where she won a "Best New Actress" award at the 31st KBS Drama Awards for her performance as the bubbly and charismatic Eun-ho. She also sung the soundtrack for the series with her group Gugudan titled "Believe in this Moment". In September 2017, it was confirmed that Kim would be a fixed cast member in Netflix's first Korean variety show Busted! alongside variety veterans Yoo Jae-suk, Kim Jong-min, Lee Kwang-soo, Ahn Jae-wook, actress Park Min-young and fellow idol Oh Se-hun. The variety show spanned for three seasons with Lee Seung-gi joining the cast in its second season.
That month, she also became a permanent MC for OnStyle's Get It Beauty alongside Honey Lee, Lee Se-young and Sandara Park. In January 2018, Kim became the first special co-host of Baek Jong-won's Alley Restaurant a cooking-variety program hosted by celebrity chef Baek Jong-won.

Kim and fellow Jellyfish Entertainment artist LEO of VIXX were chosen to sing the official cheer song entitled "We, the Reds" for the South Korea national football team for the 2018 World Cup Tournament. In June 2018, she was cast as one of the members of MDRS team led by Kim Byung-man in their third time working together, with actress Ha Ji-won and 2 PM's Nichkhun for tvN's sci-fi variety program Galileo: Awakened Universe that explores the idea of life on Mars. All the members flew to Utah, United States to the Mars Desert Research Station (MDRS), the largest and longest-running Mars surface simulation facility in the world. They were the first Korean entertainment crew to set foot on the Research Station.

In June 2018, a Gugudan subgroup named Gugudan SeMiNa was formed with Kim and fellow Produce 101 alumn members Mina and Nayoung. They debuted on July 10, 2018, with the single "SeMiNa". In September 2018, Kim released the song "Paramour" for the soundtrack of the drama Mr. Sunshine.

2019–present: Solo career, musical debut and success as an actress 
In 2019, Kim went on to take her second leading role in the mystery romantic-comedy drama I Wanna Hear Your Song where she played a timpanist who lost her memories due to traumatic events. She would later win the K-Drama Hallyu Star Award on the 2019 KBS Drama Awards for the role. After a year of hiatus as a singer and three years since her solo debut song, Kim released the single "Tunnel" in collaboration with Dingo Music on December 2, 2019, followed by her first self-written and composed extended play titled Plant, with its lead single of the same name, released on March 17, 2020. She received her second music award show trophy on The Show  for her single. She wrote and composed all the tracks from her EP, except for the lead single. Kim released the song "All of My Days" for the soundtrack of the drama Crash Landing on You, which charted at number 50 on the Gaon Digital Chart, followed by "What My Heart Says" for the soundtrack of Record of Youth. She later released the digital single "Whale" on August 17, 2020.

Kim then went on to make her musical debut as the female lead in Return: The Promise of the Day, an original army musical that deals with the topic of excavating the remains of the heroic soldiers who sacrificed themselves to protect their country during the Korean War. On July 15, 2020, she was confirmed to star in the fantasy thriller drama The Uncanny Counter, where she played the role of Do Ha-na. Before filming the drama, Kim together with her co-stars trained in an action school to prepare for their respective roles. The drama went on to become the highest-rated OCN series of all time, its immense popularity also led to a renewal for season 2. Kim also contributed to the drama's OST through her self-written and composed song "Meet Again" which charted at 147 on the Gaon Digital chart. After two years of inactivity, on December 31, 2020, Jellyfish Entertainment officially disbanded Gugudan and on May 11, 2021, Kim renewed her contract with the company as a solo artist and actress.

On March 9, 2021, it was revealed that Kim was in the middle of preparing for a comeback. On March 29, 2021, Kim released her second self-written and composed EP titled I'm with its lead single "Warning." Later that year, she was also featured in MC Mong's Flower 9 album with the song "Can I Go Back." On April 5, 2021, it was announced that Kim would make her second musical appearance through Red Book, a musical drama about women's growth that seeks pride and dignity in the Victorian era. She played Anna, the protagonist of the story, who defied all odds against prejudice about women in the Victorian era. Kim performed from June 7 to August 24, 2021, for a total of 28 shows. Red Book Musical received a viewer rating of 9.9 out of 10, and currently holds the highest viewer rating among the top 20 sales for 2021 Musicals. The musical would later on win the Best Picture Award, as well as Best New Musical Actress nomination for Kim at the 2022 Korean Musical Awards.

On May 4, 2021, Kim and the members of I.O.I celebrated their fifth debut anniversary with a reunion live stream show called "Yes, I Love It!". On July 23, 2021, Kim collaborated with Municon and released the digital single "Baby I Love U", which is a remake of the same song by Japanese singer TEE. At the end of 2021, Kim hosted the 2021 MBC Entertainment Awards with Jun Hyun-moo and Lee Sang-yi.

In February 2022, Kim returned to the small screen as the female lead for the SBS romantic comedy Business Proposal alongside Ahn Hyo-seop. The drama proved to be one of the most talked about Korean drama of the year and recorded the highest viewership ratings (11.6%) for a terrestrial Mon-Tue drama in 2022 and fourth overall most watched drama in National TV. The drama is the first Korean-made TV series that is simultaneously shown on a local TV channel and Netflix to rank No. 1 on the official viewership chart and ranked eight overall in Netflix's Most Popular Non-English Shows for 2022. Kim's performance drew praises from viewers and critics and dubbed her as the new Romantic Comedy Princess and earned the nickname "Emma Stone of Korea". An acoustic version of "Love, Maybe" sung by Kim was released as a bonus track. The track peaked at number 108 and 92 on the Gaon Digital Chart and K-pop Hot 100 respectively.

Kim also starred in another SBS Drama Today's Webtoon alongside Choi Daniel and Nam Yoon-su. Kim's first solo fan meeting was scheduled to be held at Yes24 Live Hall on March 26, but was later postponed to April 23, after she tested positive for COVID-19. Kim held her first overseas fan meeting in Jakarta, Indonesia, Bangkok, Thailand and Japan, on November 4, 6 and 11.

At the end of the year,  Kim ranked 3rd on the Actress category and 6th overall for RACOI's Most Mentioned Drama Actors/Actress for the year 2022 and won Asia Artist Award's Popularity and Best Actor Award. Kim hosted the SBS Drama Awards ceremony with Business Proposal partner Ahn Hyo-seop and comedian ‎Shin Dong-yup. For her performance in Business Proposal, Kim won the Top Excellence Award, Actress in a Miniseries Romance/Comedy Drama and Best Couple award with Ahn.

Other ventures

Endorsements 
Kim is considered 2021's Top CF star for her work as an advertising model in various fields such as food, architecture, home appliances, games, and public service advertisements. Previously, she also took first place in 2017's Female Advertising Model Brand Reputation survey for the month of June and July.

She was the Global Advertising Model for Crocs Come As You Are campaign alongside international actors Natalie Dormer, Zooey Deschanel, Gina Jin, and Japanese model Suzu Hirose. In 2018, she was selected as the brand model for Coca Cola's Spring Summer campaign with actor Park Bo-gum.
She was the exclusive model for Lotte High-Mart and was paired with Astro's Cha Eun-woo for Lotte's popular Water Park Commercial Film. In January 2019, she became the new face for the alcoholic beverage, Good Day Soju alongside celebrity chef Baek Jong-won. Kim was also featured in an advertisement for Dong Won Tuna together with actor Jo Jung-suk. In 2020, she and her The Uncanny Counter cast mates, Yeom Hye-ran and Moon Suk modeled for Dyson Coral™ Hair straightener product. Kim and Yeom participated in a three-episode web variety show titled The Uncanny Touch for the product's promotion.

Kim also endorsed: Beauty Products such as Manyo Factory Brand Cosmetics, Acwell, and Myskin Solus; food and beverage products such as Cocolab, Sunkist Fruit Cider, and Viyotte; online and RPG games Sudden Attack, Destiny Child: Defense War, and Armis where she released a music video for the games' promotion; and other popular advertisements such as Samsung's virtual assistant Bixby, GH Basic Housing, Oella (Home Appliances) and among others.

Kim participated in campaigns such as "Online Smoking Cessation" for Korea Health Promotion and Development Institute, Korea Creative Content Agency's Campaign to "Eradicate the use of Illegal Webtoon Distribution Sites" and National Health Insurance Corporation's "Smoking Cessation Treatment".

In 2022, Kim was the endorser for cosmetic and clothing brands O!geti, Julie's Choice, and Roem; food and beverage products such as Goobne Chicken and Lotte's Starlight Cheongha Sparkling Alcohol;  Living Workshop Household Goods and popular video game Nexon's MapleStory where she was chosen to sing the theme song for Cygnus Knights.

Ambassadorship 
Kim was selected as an ambassador for the 2022 Hanoi Hallyu Expo.

In October 2022, Kim together with Ahn Hyo-seop were chosen as brand ambassadors for Indonesian food and drink product Realfood. They collaborated with Indonesian actor Chicco Jerikho for a series of mini commercial episodes to promote the brand.

In February 2023, Kim was chosen as the first Asian Global ambassador for French luxury brand Longchamp.

Philanthropy 
On March 8, 2022, Kim donated  million to the Hope Bridge Disaster Relief Association to help the victims of the massive wildfire that started in Uljin, Gyeongbuk and has spread to Samcheok, Gangwon. On March 31, Kim donated  million to Fruit of Love, Community Chest of Korea to help war refugees in Ukraine. On August 19, Kim donated  to the Hope Bridge Korea Disaster Relief Association to help those affected by the 2022 South Korean floods. On September 7, Kim donated  to the Hope Bridge Korea Disaster Relief Association to support those who suffered damages due to Typhoon Hinnamnor.

On February 10, 2023, Kim donated  to the Hope Bridge National Disaster Relief Association to help victims of the 2023 Turkey–Syria earthquake.

Image and influence 
Kim was the main vocalist for both I.O.I and Gugudan and is known for her sweet powerful raspy voice as well as for her emotional healing songs. Kim cites IU, Girls' Generation's Taeyeon and Ailee as her role models in singing and often uses their songs in her practice sessions. Kim is oftentimes called the icon of "Flower Way" through broadcasts and media after her famous speech to her mother, "I will only let you walk on the flower road from now on," during the first elimination round of Produce 101 where she won first place. Her first solo song "Flower Way" was based on the letter Kim wrote for her mother in Talents for Sale where she was a host. In August 2021, she won the Multi-tainer Award at 2021 Brand of the Year Awards for her works on various entertainment field such as music, drama, variety and musicals.

Aside from singing and acting, Kim is a sports enthusiast and known for her athletic skills and strong physique and have been featured on various entertainment shows and headlines thus receiving the tag "Strong Female Idol." Kim together with her group Gugudan are three-time gold medalists in three consecutive years and record holders for the Women's Archery Competition in Idol Star Athletics Championships  and a gold medalist and record holder with her I.O.I and Gugudan member Mina in Women's Bowling Competition.

Discography

Extended plays

Singles

Other charted songs

Soundtrack appearances

Compilation appearances

Composition credits 
All song credits are adapted from the Korea Music Copyright Association's database under Kim Sejeong unless otherwise noted.

Filmography

Television series

Television shows

Web shows

Hosting

Theatre

Awards and nominations

Notes

References

External links

 
 
 

Kim Se-jeong
1996 births
People from Anyang, Gyeonggi
People from Gimje
Living people
Jellyfish Entertainment artists
South Korean female idols
South Korean women pop singers
Swing Entertainment artists
South Korean television actresses
South Korean musical theatre actresses
K-pop Star participants
Produce 101 contestants
Gugudan
I.O.I members
21st-century South Korean women singers
21st-century South Korean singers
21st-century South Korean actresses
Gwangsan Kim clan